Aliyu Sabi Abdullahi CON (born 10 January 1967) is Nigerian Politician, and the Senator representing Niger North Senatorial District of Niger State at the Nigerian 8th National Assembly and 9th National Assembly. He is the deputy chief whip at the Nigerian 9th National Assembly.

Polictical career
Abdullahi participated in the March 28, 2015, Niger North Senatorial District Election and was announced as the Winner.
In February 2019 Niger North Senatorial District election, he was re-elected a Senator having polled 161,420 votes, while Hon Muhammad Sani Duba of the PDP polled 77,109 votes.

Award 
In October 2022, a Nigerian national honour of Commander Of The Order Of The Niger (CON) was conferred on him by President Muhammadu Buhari.

References

1967 births
Living people
Nigerian politicians